Lawrencepur is a town in Attock District of Punjab Province in Pakistan. It is situated on Grand Trunk Road.

Lawrencepur railway station is a railway station for town but it is not used now.

References

Cities and towns in Attock District